Images and Words: Live in Tokyo is the first home video release from American progressive metal band Dream Theater.  It contains most of the band's performance from their August 26, 1993 show at Nakano Sun Plaza in Tokyo, Japan.  Also included are the music videos for the songs "Pull Me Under", "Take the Time", and "Another Day", from their 1992 album Images and Words, as well as interview footage and candid, behind-the-scenes footage.

Track listing
"Intro"
"Under a Glass Moon"
"The Making of Images and Words"
"Pull Me Under" (Video Clip)
"Take the Time" (Video Clip)
"Kimonos & Condoms"
"Wait for Sleep"
"Surrounded"
"Ytse Jam/Drum Solo"
"Another Day" (Video Clip)
"To Live Forever"
"A Fortune in Lies"
"Abbey Road medley"
"Puppies on Acid/Take the Time"
"On the Road '93"
"Pull Me Under"

Trivia

 In 2004, Live in Tokyo was released as Disc 1 of the Images and Words: Live in Tokyo / 5 Years in a LIVEtime DVD re-release.  A commentary track by the band members was included on the DVD.
 "Puppies on Acid" was a song originally written for live performances and as seen on this video is used for an intro to "Take the Time"; this intro was later made into a full song which would become "The Mirror" on Awake, released in 1994.

1993 video albums
Dream Theater video albums
Dream Theater live albums
Live video albums
1993 live albums
Albums recorded at Nakano Sun Plaza